Angus Buchanan (15 January 1847 – 21 February 1927) was a Scottish international rugby and cricket player.

Rugby Union career

Amateur career

He also played simultaneously for Royal High School FP, and Edinburgh University.

Provincial career

Buchanan played for Edinburgh District.

International career

Buchanan played in the first ever  side, and scored the first try in international rugby, after a deemed failed attempt by George Ritchie. Scotland had pushed a scrum over the English try-line, and Buchanan had fallen on the ball.

This was converted by William Cross, which created the score (crucially because it was goals that counted, not tries). The English argued that the try should not stand, but it was awarded by the umpire Dr Hely Hutchinson Almond (also a Scot - the umpires were two on the field: one from each side)

Almond made a questionable justification of his decision:
"Let me make a confession: I do not know whether the decision which gave Scotland the try from which the winning goal was kicked was correct in fact. When an umpire is in doubt, I think he is justified in deciding against the side which makes the most noise. They are probably in the wrong."

According to one of the English players:
"After a maul, just outside the English goal-line the umpires ordered the ball to be put down in the scrummage five yards outside the line. It was taken was out accordingly, but, instead of putting it down, the Scottish forwards drove the entire scrummage into goal, and then grounded the ball and claimed a try. This, though illegal according to English laws, was allowed by the umpires and the goal was kicked by Cross."

According to confirmed records, Buchanan was the first Scotland player born, in January, 1847, and was twenty four years and two months old when capped.

Referee career

Buchanan became an international referee. He refereed the Scotland versus Ireland match on 14 February 1880.

Cricket career

Buchanan also played for the Scotland national cricket team.

In media

In fiction, Buchanan is a part of the larger Harry Potter universe, appearing in an excerpt written by J.K. Rowling for the Pottermore website. According to this, Angus Buchanan was born in a wizarding family, but was non-magical i.e a Squib. Also, he is supposed to have published a "path breaking" book called My Life as a Squib, which highlighted his struggles to survive in a community which disowned him and the way he found a home in the Muggle world.

See also
 List of Scottish cricket and rugby union players

References

Sources

 Bath, Richard (ed.) The Scotland Rugby Miscellany (Vision Sports Publishing Ltd, 2007 )
 Massie, Allan A Portrait of Scottish Rugby (Edinburgh: Polygon, 1987 )

1847 births
1927 deaths
Alumni of the University of Edinburgh
Cricketers from Inveraray
Edinburgh District (rugby union) players
Edinburgh University RFC players
Presidents of the Scottish Rugby Union
Royal HSFP players
Rugby union players from Inveraray
Scotland international rugby union players
Scottish cricketers
Scottish rugby union players
Scottish rugby union referees